The Sheriff of Edinburgh was historically the royal official responsible for enforcing law and order and bringing criminals to justice in the shire of Edinburgh (also known as Edinburghshire or Midlothian) in Scotland. In 1482 the burgh of Edinburgh itself was given the right to appoint its own sheriff, and thereafter the sheriff of Edinburgh's authority applied in the area of Midlothian outside the city, whilst still being called the sheriff of Edinburgh. Prior to 1748 most sheriffdoms were held on a hereditary basis. From that date, following the Jacobite uprising of 1745, they were replaced by salaried sheriff-deputes, qualified advocates who were members of the Scottish Bar.

In 1872, following mergers, the sheriffdom became known as the sheriffdom of Midlothian and Haddington  After further reorganisations it became part of the sheriffdoms of The Lothians in 1881 and The Lothians and Peebles in 1883.

Sheriffs of Edinburgh

Norman (1143–1147)
Geoffrey de Melville (1153)
Robert (1162–1165)
Henry de Brade (1165–1214)
Thomas de Lastalrie (1210)
John de Vallibus (1214–1249)
John de Graham (1225)
Roger de Mowbray (1263)
William St. Clair (1264-1265)
William St. Clair (1288-1290)
Hugh de Lowther (1292-1296)
Walter de Huntercombe (1296)
John de Kingston (1300)
Ebulo IV de Montibus (1303)
Ivo de Aldeburgh (1305)
Piers de Lombard (1313)
Robert de Menzies (1328)
John de Kingston (1334)
John de Strivelyn (1335)
Laurence Preston (1337)
Gilbert Fouler (1358)
William Ramsay
Archibald Douglas, Earl of Douglas (1360(?)-1364) Exact date of appointment in doubt
Robert de Dalyell (1366)
Simon de Preston (1367)
Thomas de Erskyne (1371)
Malcolm Fleming (1374)
John Lyon of Glamis (1380)
Adam Forrester (1382)
William Lindsay (1390–1406)
Henry Preston (1435)
William de Crechtoun (1438)
John Logan (1444)
John Haldane (1460)
Alexander Hepburn (1482)
Patrick Hepburn, Earl of Bothwell (1488-1508)
Adam Hepburn, Earl of Bothwell (1508-1513)
Patrick Hepburn, Earl of Bothwell (1513–?1556)
William Seton of Kylesmure (1616)
George Gordon, 1st Earl of  Aberdeen (1682–1684) 
James Drummond, 4th Earl of Perth (1684–1689) 
No appointment (1689–1710) 
William Ramsay, 5th Earl of Dalhousie (1703–1710) 
Charles Maitland, 6th Earl of Lauderdale (1718–1744) 
James Maitland, 7th Earl of Lauderdale (1744–1748) 
Charles Maitland of Pittrichie, 1748   sheriff depute
Hon Walter Sandilands, 8th Lord Torpichen, 1748–  sheriff depute
Archibald Cockburn, 1765–1790 
John Pringle, 1790–1793 
James Clerk, 1793–1809 
William Rae, 1809–1819  
Adam Duff, 1819–1840 
Robert Cunningham Graham Spiers, 1840–1847 
John Thomson Gordon, 1848–c.1852 
Archibald Davidson of Slateford, <1870–>1886>

Sheriffs of Midlothian and Haddington (1872)

 For sheriffs after 1881 see the Sheriff of the Lothians and Peebles

See also
 Historical development of Scottish sheriffdoms

References

Extracts From the Records of the Burgh of Edinburgh, 1403-1528, ed. J D Marwick (Edinburgh, 1869), 'Appendix: Sheriffs of the shire of Edinburgh'

Sheriff
History of Edinburgh